Pavetta brachycalyx is a species of plant in the family Rubiaceae. It is endemic to Cameroon.  Its natural habitats are subtropical or tropical moist lowland forests and subtropical or tropical moist montane forests. It is threatened by habitat loss.

References

Flora of Cameroon
brachycalyx
Endangered plants
Taxonomy articles created by Polbot